Nebria bousqueti is a species of ground beetle in the Nebriinae subfamily that can be found in China and Taiwan.

References

bousqueti
Beetles described in 1993
Beetles of Asia